Youn Young-seong (born August 13, 1991 in Tokyo) is a South Korean football player. He plays for Vonds Ichihara.

Playing career
Youn Young-seong played for Daegu FC from 2013 to 2014. He played for J2 League club; Mito HollyHock and Thespakusatsu Gunma from 2014 to 2015. In June 2016, he joined to Vonds Ichihara.

References

External links

1991 births
Living people
Association football people from Tokyo
South Korean footballers
J2 League players
Mito HollyHock players
Thespakusatsu Gunma players
Vonds Ichihara players
Association football midfielders